GroupPrice was a business-to-business deal website that sells discounted software and services for small to medium-sized Internet centric companies. GroupPrice enabled online merchants to advertise their products and services to a target audience of small businesses.

The company targeted businesses with an online presence up to 25 employees and up to $10 million in annual revenue. GroupPrice took a commission from each purchased deal and passed the sale to the merchant with new customer information.

GroupPrice sold software and services to American small businesses and differs from the business-to-consumer daily deal model made popular by Groupon including; no local deals on food or entertainment, no minimum number of sales needed before a buyer can have access to the deal, and no time limit tied to the deal.

History
GroupPrice was founded by Van Jepson in June 2010 in Redwood City, California.

The company was self-funded with $30,000 before several advisors turned into investors and completed a seed round of $285,000 in July 2010.

It launched on November 30, 2010.

Awards
GroupPrice was named one of Entrepreneur Magazine's top 100 Brilliant Companies in 2011 in the Startup-to-Startup category.

References

Defunct websites
Internet properties established in 2010
Online marketplaces of the United States